The All-America Rose Selections (AARS) is an award that was given annually, from 1940 to 2013, by the American rose industry to an outstanding new rose variety. The AARS selection was regarded as the most prestigious rose prize in the United States for 73 years. AARS was discontinued after 2013, and was replaced in 2016 by the new American Garden Rose Selections (AGRS) program.

History
In 1938, W. Ray Hastings, creator of "All-America Rose Selections", approached Charles Perkins, president of the Jackson & Perkins company with an idea for a rose testing program. Their conversation led to a meeting in Chicago on January 8, 1939,  with representatives from the seventeen largest rose growers. The outcome of the meeting was the creation of the non-profit organization, "All-America Rose Selections, Inc. (AARS),  with the goal of evaluating and promoting outstanding roses."'  The first rose trials began in 1939 in AARS test gardens throughout the US. The first AARS winners were announced in 1940.

The "All-America Rose Selections" continued each year from 1940 until 2013. The award is considered to be the most prestigious rose award in the United States. Hybrid tea rose, 'Francis Meilland' was the last rose awarded by AARS. AARS was discontinued after 2013, and was replaced by the new "American Garden Rose Selections" program.

Rose testing and selection
The AARS selection process began with a rose grower submitting a new rose (or roses) to AARS for testing. Roses were grown in  official rose testing gardens, typically universities and rose nurseries throughout the US. Roses would be evaluated for two years on many qualities, including disease resistance, flowers, form, and ability to grow in many climates. "The AARS award winners chosen at the end of the trial period comprise only about four percent of all the roses tested". The winning roses can display the AARS brand on their rose tags and in nursery catalogues.

AARS winners
This is a partial list of All-America Rose Selection winners.

See also
Rose trial grounds
International Rose Test Garden
List of Award of Garden Merit roses
Rose Hall of Fame

Notes

References
 

Lists of cultivars
Plant awards
Rose cultivars